List of schools in Belgium.

List of schools in Antwerp
List of schools in East Flanders
List of schools in West Flanders
List of schools in Limburg
List of schools in Brussels

See also
 Education in Belgium

 
Belgium